Elwood Adrian "Woody" Norris (June 18, 1919 – April 25, 2007) was an American professional basketball player. He played for the Indianapolis Kautskys in the National Basketball League during the 1941–42 season, served in the United States Army Air Forces during World War II, then continued his basketball career with the Kautskys between 1945 and 1948. In college he played basketball and football for Butler University.

References

1919 births
2007 deaths
American men's basketball players
United States Army Air Forces personnel of World War II
Basketball players from Indiana
Butler Bulldogs football players
Butler Bulldogs men's basketball players
Forwards (basketball)
Guards (basketball)
Indianapolis Kautskys players
People from Washington, Indiana